Picea orientalis, commonly known as the Oriental spruce or Caucasian spruce, is a species of spruce native to the Caucasus and adjacent northeast Turkey.

Description
It is a large coniferous evergreen tree growing to 30–45 m tall or 98–145 feet (exceptionally to 57 m), and with a trunk diameter of up to 1.5 m (exceptionally up to 4 m). The Caucasian Spruce can also be found in Northern Iran, though its numbers have decreased due to deforestation.

The shoots are buff-brown and moderately pubescent (hairy). The leaves are needle-like, the shortest of any spruce, 6–8 mm long, rhombic in cross-section, dark green with inconspicuous stomatal lines. The cones are slender cylindric-conic, 5–9 cm long and 1.5 cm broad, red to purple when young, maturing dark brown 5–7 months after pollination, and have stiff, smoothly rounded scales.

Cultivation
It is a popular ornamental tree in large gardens, valued in northern Europe and the USA for its attractive foliage and ability to grow on a wide range of soils. It is also grown to a small extent in forestry for Christmas trees, timber and paper production, though its slower growth compared to Norway spruce reduces its importance outside of its native range. P. orientalis and the cultivars 'Aurea'  and ‘Skylands’ have gained the Royal Horticultural Society's Award of Garden Merit.  A frequently seen ornamental cultivar is Picea orientalis 'Aureospicata', which has gold-coloured young foliage in the spring.

References

External links

Gymnosperm Database
 Picea orientalis - information, genetic conservation units and related resources. European Forest Genetic Resources Programme (EUFORGEN)

Least concern plants
Ornamental trees
orientalis
Plants described in 1847
Trees of Europe
Trees of Turkey